Ethel Roosevelt may refer to:
Ethel du Pont, Ethel Roosevelt Warren née duPont, (1916–1965), wife of Franklin D. Roosevelt, Jr.
Ethel Roosevelt Derby (1891–1977), daughter of President Theodore Roosevelt